Jennifer Jane Tiramani (born 16 August 1954) is a British costume, stage and production designer. Since 2012 she has been principal of the School of Historical Dress in London.

Early life 
Tiramani was born on 16 August 1954, the daughter of Fredo Paulo Tiramani and Barbara Doreen Tiramani née King. She attended Dartford Grammar School for Girls. She completed a foundation course at the Central School of Art and Design in London and then received a first class diploma in Theatre Design from Trent Polytechnic in 1976.

Career
From 1980 to 1997, Tiramani was an associate designer at the Theatre Royal Stratford East. From 1997 to 2002 she held the same position at Shakespeare's Globe in Southwark, and from 2003 to 2005 was director of theatre design there. From 2008 to 2011 she was a visiting professor at the School of Art and Design of Nottingham Trent University.

As an expert on Elizabethan and Jacobean clothing she evaluated the Sanders portrait of William Shakespeare and was an advisor to the Searching for Shakespeare exhibition at the National Portrait Gallery in 2006.

Work
Tiramani has designed opera costumes for productions including Orlando for the Opéra de Lille in 2010, La Clemenza di Tito at the Festival International d'Art Lyrique d'Aix-en-Provence in 2011 and Anna Bolena at the Metropolitan Opera of New York in 2012.

Awards

Publications
 Janet Arnold, Jenny Tiramani, Santina Levey: Patterns of Fashion 4: The cut and construction of linen shirts, smocks, neckwear, headwear and accessories for men and women c. 1540 - 1660. Macmillan, November 2008. Paperback. .
 Jenny Tiramani, Luca Costigliolo, Claire Thornton, Armelle Lucas and Christine Prentis, Susan North (editor): Seventeenth-Century Women's Dress Patterns (Book 1). V&A Publishing, April 2011. Hardcover. .
 Jenny Tiramani, Susan North (editor): Seventeenth-Century Women's Dress Patterns (Book 2). V&A Publishing, April 2013. Hardcover. .
 Alan Hopkins, Jenny Tiramani (series editor): Footwear: Shoes and Boots from the Hopkins Collection c. 1730 - 1950. Hardcover February 2015 (in print)
 Ulinka Rublack, Maria Hayward, Jenny Tiramani: The First Book of Fashion: The Book of Clothes of Matthaeus and Veit Konrad Schwarz of Augsburg. Hardcover. October 2015 (in print)

References

External links 
 Jenny Tiramani authorized biography
 Jenny Tiramani biography at the Performing Arts, UK, site
 Jenny Tiramani biography at the School of Historical Dress, UK, site 
 Jenny Tiramani biography at the Royal Opera House, UK, site
 Tony Awards Acceptance Speech
 Jenny Tiramani Talks About Costuming for The Globe
 Jenny Tiramani at the Scottish National Portrait Gallery: Talk About Costumes at the Event Dressed to Thrill Dec-2012

English costume designers
Living people
Tony Award winners
1954 births
People educated at Dartford Grammar School for Girls
Alumni of Nottingham Trent University